Råå IF is a Swedish or Scanian football club located in Råå, a fishing village at Öresund, that grew to be one of Scandinavia's largest in the late 1800's, south of Helsingborg. They became the Swedish Cup champions in 1948, and the vice champions of the highest league level 1950–51.

Background
Råå Idrottsförening (RIF) is a Swedish or Scanian sports club that was established on 25 March 1921 by a group of high school students in a basement in the city district of Helsingborg, Tågaborg. The club was first called Enighet (translation: Unity), but in 1925 it was renamed Råå Idrottsförening. Early matches were played at Valhallagatan but in 1928 they moved to Hedens idrottsplats. Råå IP was inaugurated on 29 May and Råå IF played their first match there against Stattena IF who won 3–1.

Since their foundation Råå IF has participated both in the upper and lower divisions of the Swedish football league system. Råå IF won the Swedish Cup in 1948 defeating BK Kenty by 6–0, and in 1950 under coach Albin Dahl the club advanced into the Allsvenskan (the Swedish top tier). In their first season in the Allsvenskan, Råå IF finished as runners-up. During this time, the club also had the Hungarian demon-trainer Kalman Konrad of Bayern Munich, FC Zurich and Slavia Prague fame, who had escaped the war and ended up in Scania (first Malmö FF, then Råå) at their desposal. 

During their two-year period in the Allsvenskan (1950–52), Råå IF played at the Olympia football stadium in Helsingborg, attracting an average of 9,273 spectators. The record was 23.604 against Malmö FF

Fortunes have fluctuated dramatically over the subsequent years which reached rock bottom in 1996 when Råå IF were playing in Division 7. The club currently plays in Division 4 Skåne Nordvästra which is the sixth tier of Swedish football. They play their home matches at the Råå IP in Råå.

Råå IF are affiliated to the Skånes Fotbollförbund.

Achievements

 Allsvenskan:
 Runners-up: 1950–51
 Svenska Cupen:
 Winner: 1948

Season to season

In their most successful period Råå IF competed in the following divisions:

In recent seasons Råå IF have competed in the following divisions:

Attendances

In recent seasons Råå IF have had the following average attendances:

In their first season in the Allsvenskan in 1951–52 Råå IF had a home attendance of 23,604 spectators against Malmö FF at the Olympia football stadium in Helsingborg.

Footnotes

External links
 Råå IF – Official website 

Allsvenskan clubs
Football in Helsingborg
Football clubs in Skåne County
Association football clubs established in 1921
1921 establishments in Sweden
Svenska Cupen winners